The 1950 Swiss Grand Prix, formally titled the Großer Preis der Schweiz für Automobile, was a Formula One motor race held on 4 June 1950 at Bremgarten. It was race four of seven in the 1950 World  Championship of Drivers. The 42-lap race was won by Alfa Romeo driver Nino Farina after he started from second position. His teammate Luigi Fagioli finished second and Talbot-Lago driver Louis Rosier came in third.

Report
The fourth round of the Championship took place just three weeks after the series began at Silverstone (with Monaco and Indianapolis having taken place on consecutive weekends). Once again the event proved to be a battle between the Alfa Romeo factory 158s of Giuseppe Farina, Juan Manuel Fangio and Luigi Fagioli and the Scuderia Ferraris of Alberto Ascari, Luigi Villoresi (who had the latest model with de Dion rear suspension, twin overhead camshaft engine and 4-speed gearbox), Raymond Sommer and Peter Whitehead. There were a number of uncompetitive Talbot-Lagos and Maseratis as usual. José Froilán González was out of action as a result of burns he had received after the first lap accident at Monaco Grand Prix. Also out of action as a result of the crash was Maserati factory driver Franco Rol. This was the last race to be entered by pre-war racer Eugène Martin. It was also the first and only World Championship Grand Prix for Nello Pagani, better known for his exploits in Grand Prix motorcycle racing. 

In qualifying Fangio and Farina were well clear of Fagioli with Villoresi and Ascari sharing the second row of the 3-2-3 grid. Peter Whitehead, Franco Rol, Reg Parnell and Rudi Fischer failed to qualify. In the race, on the first lap Ascari managed to get among the Alfa Romeos but he quickly slipped back and it was left to the Alfas to battle. Fangio led early on but then Farina went ahead through a faster refuelling stop. Fagioli was unable to keep up and after both Villoresi and Ascari retired. It was left to Prince Bira to run fourth. He had to refuel and so Philippe Étancelin in a Talbot-Lago was able to move into fourth place. Shortly afterwards, factory Talbot-Lago driver Eugène Martin crashed heavily and was seriously hurt when he was thrown from the car. Étancelin later went out with gearbox trouble and so Talbot-Lago factory driver Louis Rosier moved into fourth. He was promoted to third when Fangio retired on lap 33 with an electrical problem. Farina became the first driver to win multiples Grands Prix, after winning the inaugural World Championship Grand Prix.

Entries

 — Nello Pagani qualified and drove all 39 laps of the race in the #2 Maserati. José Froilán González, named substitute driver for the car, was absent due to injury.

Classification

Qualifying

Race

Notes
 – Includes 1 point for fastest lap

Championship standings after the race 
Drivers' Championship standings

 Note: Only the top five positions are listed. Only the best 4 results counted towards the Championship.

References

Swiss
Swiss Grand Prix
Grand Prix
Swiss